Paul Hugh McIntosh (born March 13, 1953) is a Canadian former professional ice hockey player who played 48 games for the Buffalo Sabres between 1974 and 1976. After his retirement he coached the London Knights of the Ontario Hockey League in the early 1980s, and also served as the team's General Manager for much of the 1990s. He won CHL Executive of the Year in 1998.  He is currently the Head Professional scout for the Dallas Stars.

McIntosh was born in Listowel, Ontario.

Career statistics

Regular season and playoffs

International

References

External links
 

1953 births
Living people
Buffalo Sabres draft picks
Buffalo Sabres players
Calgary Flames scouts
Canadian ice hockey defencemen
Dallas Stars scouts
Hershey Bears players
London Knights coaches
People from Perth County, Ontario
Peterborough Petes (ice hockey) players
Saginaw Gears players
Springfield Indians players
Vancouver Canucks scouts